Petria Ann Thomas,  (born 25 August 1975) is an Australian swimmer and Olympic gold medallist and a winner of 15 national titles. She was born in Lismore, New South Wales, and grew up in the nearby town of Mullumbimby.

Career
In 1993, at the age of 17, Thomas won a bronze medal in the 200-metre butterfly at the World Short Course Championships.  She followed this with two gold medals, in the 100-metre butterfly and 4×100-metre freestyle in the 1994 Commonwealth Games in Victoria, Canada. However, she then struggled for two years, until making a comeback at the 1996 Summer Olympics in Atlanta in 1996.  She won a silver medal, finishing second to fellow Australian Susie O'Neill.

Despite being plagued by a shoulder injury, Thomas repeated her 1994 Commonwealth Games effort at the 1998 Games in Kuala Lumpur. She also won a bronze in the 100-metre butterfly and a silver in the 200-metre at the World Championships in Perth, the same year. She had similar success at the 2000 Summer Olympics in Sydney in 2000, winning three medals – bronze in the 200-metre butterfly, silver in the 4×100-metre medley, and silver in the 4×200-metre freestyle.

Thomas had always struggled to surpass O'Neill, despite being talented in her own right. However, after the 2000 games, O'Neill retired, and Thomas, despite battling recurring injuries, decided to continue. The decision paid off when she won three gold medals at the 2001 World Championships in Fukuoka, Japan. She won both the 100-metre and 200-metre butterfly, and then was part of the winning 4×100-metre medley relay team. She was also part of the 4×200-metre freestyle relay team, which completed the race first, but they were disqualified when Thomas jumped in the pool to celebrate before the other competitors had completed the race.

At the 2002 Commonwealth Games, Thomas won five gold, one silver and one bronze medals.  While being one of the pinnacles of her career, her victory also made her the first female swimmer ever to win the same event at three consecutive Commonwealth Games – the 100-metre butterfly. She followed this with three gold and two silver medals at the 2002 Pan Pacific Championships in Yokohama, Japan. At the short-course championships in Moscow, Russia, Thomas won another gold medal in her pet event, the 200-metre butterfly. However, injuries forced her out of competition soon afterwards, and she had to spend much of 2003 recovering from yet another shoulder reconstruction.

In 2004, Thomas made another comeback at the Olympic selection trials in Sydney while training with the Ginninderra Swimming Club. She broke the Commonwealth records in the 50-metre and 100-metre butterfly, set new personal best times in the 100-metre freestyle, 200-metre freestyle and narrowly missed the world record in the 200-metre butterfly.

After having missed out on first place in 1996 and 2000, Thomas finally achieved gold at the 2004 Summer Olympics in Athens. She won the individual 100-metre butterfly, and was a part of two world record-setting teams in the 4×100-metre freestyle and 4×100-metre medley relays. She was subsequently chosen to carry the Australian flag at the closing ceremony. Thomas announced her retirement from competitive swimming at the conclusion of the games.

In mid-2005, Thomas released an autobiography, Swimming Against The Tide, in which she describes her career, including her experiences with depression and injuries.

She currently resides in Amaroo, Canberra, with her husband, Julian Jones, the head strength and conditioning coach at the AIS. They have two children. Thomas manages the Swimming Australia National Training Centre at the AIS.

She served as Chef de Mission of the Australian team at the 2022 Commonwealth Games held in Birmingham, England.

Recognition

 1996 – Australian Institute of Sport Swimming Hall of Fame inductee
 2001 –  AIS Athlete of the Year (with gymnast Philippe Rizzo) 
 2002 – AIS Athlete of the Year
 2006 – AIS 'Best of the Best' inductee 
 2007 – Sport Australia Hall of Fame inductee 
 2022 – University of Canberra Sport Walk of Fame inaugural inductee
 2022 – Australian Institute of Sport Leadership Award

See also
 List of Olympic medalists in swimming (women)
 List of Commonwealth Games medallists in swimming (women)
 List of multiple Summer Olympic medalists
 World record progression 4 × 100 metres freestyle relay
 World record progression 4 × 100 metres medley relay

References

External links
 

1975 births
Living people
Sportswomen from New South Wales
Olympic swimmers of Australia
Swimmers at the 1996 Summer Olympics
Swimmers at the 2000 Summer Olympics
Swimmers at the 2004 Summer Olympics
Olympic gold medalists for Australia
Olympic silver medalists for Australia
Olympic bronze medalists for Australia
Commonwealth Games gold medallists for Australia
Commonwealth Games silver medallists for Australia
Commonwealth Games bronze medallists for Australia
Recipients of the Medal of the Order of Australia
Sport Australia Hall of Fame inductees
Australian Institute of Sport swimmers
World record setters in swimming
Olympic bronze medalists in swimming
Australian female freestyle swimmers
Australian female butterfly swimmers
Swimmers at the 1994 Commonwealth Games
Swimmers at the 1998 Commonwealth Games
World Aquatics Championships medalists in swimming
People from the Northern Rivers
Medalists at the FINA World Swimming Championships (25 m)
Medalists at the 2004 Summer Olympics
Medalists at the 2000 Summer Olympics
Medalists at the 1996 Summer Olympics
Olympic gold medalists in swimming
Olympic silver medalists in swimming
Commonwealth Games medallists in swimming
University of Canberra alumni
Medallists at the 1994 Commonwealth Games
Medallists at the 1998 Commonwealth Games